Shoes is an American rock band formed in Zion, Illinois in 1974. The group's musical style is influenced by British Invasion groups of the 1960s and has often been described as "power pop" by fans and critics. The original members were brothers John and Jeff Murphy, Gary Klebe and Skip Meyer.

Shoes formed their own record label, Black Vinyl Records in 1977, and later recorded three albums for Elektra Records. With the debut of MTV in August 1981, Shoes were one of the first groups to be shown on the music video channel.

The group also owned and operated their own recording studio, Short Order Recorder, from 1983 to 2004. Many other artists also recorded at the studio and some went on to sign major label recording contracts, including Local H and Material Issue.

History

1970s 
The Murphy brothers and Klebe were high school friends and decided to form a band following graduation. At the time none of the members knew how to play an instrument. Each member picked one and promised to reunite within a year. John Murphy took up bass, while Jeff Murphy and Gary Klebe learned guitar. The three quickly began to write and rehearse original songs. 

Between 1974 and 1976 the group made a series of home recordings which had very limited circulation. By 1977 the group had added drummer Skip Meyer. The same year they also recorded the album Black Vinyl Shoes in the Murphy family living room. The band used a consumer grade 4-track reel-to-reel machine made by TEAC. The band had 1,000 copies pressed on Black Vinyl Records, and sold it at local record stores and by mail order through Bomp! magazine. 

Shoes then entered a professional studio for the first time and released a single "Tomorrow Night" on Bomp! Records in June 1978. The following  November Black Vinyl Shoes was licensed to PVC Records, which re-issued the album to national distribution in the US. It was also released in the UK by Sire Records. 

The group signed to Elektra in April 1979 and released their first major label album, Present Tense, that September. The album was produced by Mike Stone at The Manor Studio in Oxfordshire, England. It peaked at number 50 on the Billboard 200 and yielded the minor hit single "Too Late" which reached number 75 on the Billboard Hot 100 and lasted 5 weeks on the chart. The album also included a new recording of "Tomorrow Night" which Elektra later released as a single.

1980s and 1990s 
When MTV went on the air on August 1, 1981, the channel aired four of Shoes' videos:  "Too Late", "Tomorrow Night", "Cruel You" and "In My Arms Again", making Shoes one of the first bands to be shown on the channel.

Elektra released the follow up studio albums Tongue Twister in 1981 and Boomerang in 1982. The label also released a limited edition promotional only 12" live EP titled Shoes on Ice in 1982. After leaving Elektra the band continued to record for their own label. Shoes did three more videos: "In Her Shadow" (1982), "When Push Comes to Shove" (1985) and "Feel the Way That I Do" (1991). 

Skip Meyer left the group by 1984. He was eventually replaced by a series of other drummers including Barry Shumaker, Ric Menck, John Richardson, and Jeff Hunter.

2000s 
The Shoes song "Your Very Eyes" was covered by Jeffrey Foskett on his 2000 album Twelve and Twelve.

In early 2007, the band released a double CD titled Double Exposure, which contains demos of their songs from the albums Present Tense and Tongue Twister. In the same time frame, Jeff Murphy published a book entitled Birth of a Band, the Record Deal and the Recording of Present Tense, which documents the band's inception and early successes.  In January 2007 Jeff released a solo album titled Cantilever.

2010s 
In January 2011 Shoes got together in the studio with drummer John Richardson to lay down rhythm tracks for a new batch of Shoes songs.  Over the next 14 months recording continued on what would become their first studio album of new material in over 17 years.  Released in mid-2012, Ignition adds to a career that spans more than four decades, giving the band the milestone of releasing music in each of the decades 1970s, 1980s, 1990s, 2000s and 2010s.

On July 9, 2014, Skip Meyer died. He was 64 years old.

Name 
The group's name does not originate from an interview the Beatles granted on their first American tour in February 1964. In Boys Don’t Lie: A History of Shoes by Mary E. Donnelly (New York college professor and managing editor of PurePopPress.com) with Moira McCormick in interviewing John Murphy, the following exchange occurred:

Discography

Albums

Singles and EPs

Tracks on compilations

References

External links
The official Shoes band web site
Their label website: Black Vinyl Records

American power pop groups
Musical groups from Illinois
Musical groups established in 1974